Arsenite methyltransferase (S-adenosyl-L-methionine:arsenic(III) methyltransferase, S-adenosyl-L-methionine:methylarsonite As-methyltransferase, methylarsonite methyltransferase) is an enzyme with systematic name S-adenosyl-L-methionine:arsenite As-methyltransferase. This enzyme catalyses the following chemical reaction

 (1) S-adenosyl-L-methionine + arsenite  S-adenosyl-L-homocysteine + methylarsonate
 (2) S-adenosyl-L-methionine + methylarsonite  S-adenosyl-L-homocysteine + dimethylarsinate

An enzyme of the biotransformation pathway that forms dimethylarsinate from inorganic arsenite and arsenate.

References

External links 
 

EC 2.1.1